The 1993 UC Davis football team represented the University of California, Davis as a member of the American West Conference (AWC) during the 1993 NCAA Division II football season. The team outscored its opponents 460 to 297 for the season. The Aggies played home games at Toomey Field in Davis, California.

This was the first and only season that UC Davis competed in the AWC. The other four teams in the conference competed at the NCAA Division I-AA level. Apparently, this was due to a decision by the program not to offer scholarships. In 1994, UC Davis became an NCAA Division II independent.

Schedule

Notes

References

UC Davis
UC Davis Aggies football seasons
American West Conference football champion seasons
UC Davis Aggies football